Side Two is the fourteenth solo album by Adrian Belew, released in 2005. It was recorded in his home studio and he played all the instruments himself.

It is part of a series of albums. The other three are Side One, Side Three and Side Four.  This album features the song "Dead Dog On Asphalt", inspired by the event (and Belew's cover painting of said event) mentioned below.

Cover artwork 
Previously, Adrian Belew was driving his truck and nearly hit a dog, when another ended up in front of him and couldn't get away.  He had always wanted to be a painter, but never had something that he was inspired to paint.  After dragging the dead dog off the road, he decided that he knew what he should paint.  The result of this is the album's cover: resembling a 'dead dog on asphalt' (the opening track).

Track listing
All songs written by Adrian Belew.
 "Dead Dog on Asphalt" – 4:05
 "I Wish I Knew" – 3:19
 "Face to Face" – 3:03
 "Asleep" – 5:23
 "Sex Nerve" – 3:06
 "Then What" – 3:02
 "Quicksand" – 3:19
 "I Know Now" – 1:26
 "Happiness" – 1:53
 "Sunlight" – 4:32

Personnel
 Adrian Belew – vocals, guitars, keyboards, bass guitar, drums, percussions, electronics, additional instrumentation

Technical
 Adrian Belew – producer, cover art
 Ken Latchney – engineer
 Andrew Mendelson – mastering
 Julie Rust – layout
 Rick Malkin – photography

References 

Adrian Belew albums
2005 albums
Albums produced by Adrian Belew
Sanctuary Records albums